Lung is a poorly attested extinct language that appears to have been closely related to Ajumbu, a Southern Bantoid language of Cameroon.

References

Beboid languages
Languages of Cameroon